The Uniform Civil Code is a proposal in India to formulate and implement personal laws of citizens which apply on all citizens equally regardless of their religion, gender and sexual orientation. Currently, personal laws of various communities are governed by their religious scriptures. Implementation of a uniform civil code across the nation is one of the contentious promises pursued by India's ruling Bharatiya Janata Party. It is an important issue regarding secularism in Indian politics and continues to remain disputed by India's political left wing, Muslim groups and other conservative religious groups and sects in defence of sharia and religious customs. Personal laws are distinguished from public law and cover marriage, divorce, inheritance, adoption and maintenance. Meanwhile, article 25-28 of the Indian constitution guarantees religious freedom to Indian citizens and allows religious groups to maintain their own affairs, article 44 of the constitution expects the Indian state to apply directive principles and common law for all Indian citizens while formulating national policies.

This draft also creates hopes for the LGBTQIA+ community in India as it does not differentiate between individuals based on their gender, or sexual orientation. Same-sex marriages are not recognised legally by any applicable law in India till now.

Personal laws were first framed during the British Raj, mainly for Hindu and Muslim citizens. The British feared opposition from community leaders and refrained from further interfering within this domestic sphere. Indian state of Goa was separated from India due to colonial rule in the erstwhile Portuguese Goa and Damaon, retained a common family law known as the Goa civil code and thus being only state in India with a uniform civil code till date. Following India's independence, Hindu code bills were introduced which largely codified and reformed personal laws in various sects among Indian religions like Buddhists, Hindus, Jains and Sikhs while exempted Christians, Jews, Muslims and Parsis, being identified as distinct communities from Hindus.

UCC emerged as a crucial topic of interest in Indian politics following the Shah Bano case in 1985. The debate arose when the question of making certain laws applicable to all citizens without abridging the fundamental right of  right to practice religious functions. The debate then focused on the Muslim Personal Law, which is partially based on the Sharia law, permitting unilateral divorce, polygamy and putting it among the legally applying the Sharia law. UCC was proposed twice, in November 2019 and March 2020 but was withdrawn soon both of the times without introduction in parliament. The bill is reported to be being contemplated due to differences between BJP and RSS.

History

British India (1858–1947) 

The debate for a uniform civil code dates back to the colonial period in India. Prior to the British rule, under the East India Company (1757–1858), they tried to reform local social and religious customs by imposing Western ideologies on India.

The Lex Loci Report of October 1840 emphasised the importance and necessity of uniformity in codification of Indian law, relating to crimes, evidences and contract but it recommended that personal laws of Hindus and Muslims should be kept outside such codification. This separation of Hindus and Muslims before law was part of the Divide and Rule policy of the British Empire that allowed them break the unity among different communities and rule over India. According to their understanding of religious divisions in India, the British separated this sphere which would be governed by religious scriptures and customs of the various communities (Hindus, Muslims, Christians and later Parsis). These laws were applied by the local courts or panchayats when dealing with regular cases involving civil disputes between people of the same religion; the State would only intervene in exceptional cases.

Throughout the country, there was a variation in preference for scriptural or customary laws because in many Hindu and Muslim communities, these were sometimes at conflict; such instances were present in communities like the Jats and the Dravidians. The Shudras, for instance, allowed widow remarriage—completely contrary to the scriptural Hindu law. The Hindu laws got preference because of their relative ease in implementation, preference for such a Brahminical system by both British and Indian judges and their fear of opposition from the high caste Hindus. The difficulty in investigating each specific practice of any community, case-by-case, made customary laws harder to implement. Towards the end of the nineteenth century, favouring local opinion, the recognition of individual customs and traditions increased.

The Muslim Personal law (based on Sharia law), was  enforced in different parts of India. It had no uniformity in its application at lower courts due to the diversity of the local cultures of Muslims in different parts of India. Even though some communities converted to Islam, the local indigenous culture continued to be dominant in their practise of Islam and therefore the application of Sharia Law was not uniform across the country. This led to the customary law, which was often more discriminatory against women, to be applied over it. Women, mainly in northern and western India, often were restrained from property inheritance and dowry settlements, both of which the Sharia provides. Due to pressure from the Muslim elite, the Shariat law of 1937 was passed which stipulated that all Indian Muslims would be governed by Islamic laws on marriage, divorce, maintenance, adoption, succession and inheritance.

Therefore, while Hindus have to follow the Hindu code bill, Muslims and other religions were given the liberty to follow their own respective laws. For Muslims The All India Muslim Personal Law Board makes the laws, which is a private entity.

Legislative reforms 
The Sharia Law in Islam had provisions that were discriminatory of women, their status and rights. Certain Hindu customs prevalent at the time discriminated against women by depriving them of inheritance, remarriage and divorce. The British and social reformers like Ishwar Chandra Vidyasagar were instrumental in outlawing such customs by getting reforms passed through legislative processes. Since the British feared opposition from orthodox community leaders, only the Indian Succession Act 1865, which was also one of the first laws to ensure women's economic security, attempted to shift the personal laws to the realm of civil. The Indian Marriage Act 1864 had procedures and reforms solely for Christian marriages.

There were law reforms passed which were beneficial to Hindu women like the Hindu Widow Remarriage Act of 1856, Married Women's Property Act of 1923 and the Hindu Inheritance (Removal of Disabilities) Act, 1928, which in a significant move, permitted a Hindu woman's right to property. However, such protection was not extended to Muslim women due to the opposition from conservative Muslim groups who wanted to follow Sharia Law.

The call for equal rights for women was only at its initial stages in India at that time and the reluctance of the British government further deterred the passing of such reforms. The All India Women's Conference (AIWC) expressed its disappointment with the male-dominated legislature and Lakshmi Menon said in an AIWC conference in 1933, "If we are to seek divorce in court, we are to state that we are not Hindus, and are not guided by Hindu law. The members in the Legislative assembly who are men will not help us in bringing any drastic changes which will be of benefit to us." The All India Women's Conference demanded a uniform civil code to replace the existing personal laws, basing it on the Karachi Congress resolution which guaranteed gender-equality.

The passing of the Hindu Women's right to Property Act of 1937, also known as the Deshmukh bill, led to the formation of the B. N. Rau committee, which was set up to determine the necessity of common Hindu laws. The committee concluded that it was time of a uniform civil code, which would give equal rights to women keeping with the modern trends of society but their focus was primarily on reforming the Hindu law. The committee reviewed the 1937 Act and recommended a civil code of marriage and succession; it was set up again in 1944 and send its report to the Indian Parliament in 1947.

The Special Marriage Act, which gave the Indian citizens an option of a civil marriage, was first enacted in 1872. It had a limited application because it required those involved to renounce their religion and was applicable mostly to non-Hindus. The later Special Marriage (Amendment) Act, 1923 permitted Hindus, Buddhists, Sikhs and Jains to marry either under their personal law or under the act without renouncing their religion as well as retaining their succession rights.

Post-colonial (1947–1985)

Hindu Code Bill and addition to the Directive Principles 

The Indian Parliament discussed the report of the Hindu law committee during the 1948–1951 and 1951–1954 sessions. The first Prime Minister of the Indian republic, Jawaharlal Nehru, his supporters and women members wanted a uniform civil code to be implemented. As Law Minister, B. R. Ambedkar was in charge of presenting the details of this bill. It was found that the orthodox Hindu laws were supportive of women's rights since monogamy, divorce and the widow's right to inherit property were present in the Shashtras. Ambedkar recommended the adoption of a uniform civil code.  Ambedkar's frequent attack on the caste system and dislike for the upper castes made him unpopular in the parliament. He had done research on the religious texts and considered the caste system in Hindu society to be flawed. According to him, only the Uniform Civil Code bill was this opportunity to reform Hindu society as well to ensure protection to Muslim women who have little protection under Sharia Law. He thus faced severe criticism from the opposition but Nehru later supported Ambedkar's reforms and demand for a Uniform Civil Code. Although a Uniform Civil Code was not introduced at the time, a Hindu Bill was introduced to ensure modern reformation of Hindu Society.

The Hindu bill itself received much criticism and the main provisions opposed were those concerning monogamy, divorce, abolition of coparcenaries (women inheriting a shared title) and inheritance to daughters. The women members of the parliament, who previously supported this, in a significant political move reversed their position and backed the Hindu law reform; they feared allying with the fundamentalists would cause a further setback to their rights.

Thus, a lesser version of this bill was passed by the parliament in 1956, in the form of four separate acts, the Hindu Marriage Act, Succession Act, Minority and Guardianship Act and Adoptions and Maintenance Act. These diluted versions supported by Jawaharlal Nehru were in contraction to  the implementation of a uniform civil code in Article 44 of the Directive principles of the Constitution specifying, "The State shall endeavour to secure for citizens a uniform civil code throughout the territory of India." This was opposed by women members like Rajkumari Amrit Kaur and Hansa Mehta.  According to academic Paula Banerjee, this move was to make sure it would never be addressed. Aparna Mahanta writes, "failure of the Indian state to provide a uniform civil code, consistent with its democratic secular and socialist declarations, further illustrates the modern state's accommodation of the traditional interests of a patriarchal society".

Later years and Special Marriage Act 
The Hindu code bill failed to control the prevalent gender discrimination. The law on divorce were framed giving both partners equal voice but majority of its implementation involved those initiated by men. Since the Act applied only to Hindus, women from the other communities remained subjugated particularly under Sharia Law which was the basis of the Muslim personal law in India. For instance, Muslim women, under the Muslim Personal Law, could not inherit agricultural land. Nehru accepted that the bill was not complete and perfect, but was cautious about implementing drastic changes which could stir up specific communities. He agreed that it lacked any substantial reforms but felt it was an "outstanding achievement" of his time. He had a significant role in getting the Hindu Code bill passed and laid down women-equality as an ideal to be pursued in Indian politics, which was eventually accepted by the previous critics of the bill. Uniform civil code, for him, was a necessity for the whole country but he was not able to convince conservative groups of its importance. Thus, his support for Uniform Civil Code was not implemented but was added to the Directive principles of the Constitution.

The Special Marriage Act, 1954, provides a form of civil marriage to any citizen irrespective of religion, thus permitting any Indian to have their marriage outside the realm of any specific religious personal law. The law applied to all of India, except Jammu and Kashmir. In many respects, the act was almost identical to the Hindu Marriage Act of 1955, which gives some idea as to how secularised the law regarding Hindus had become. The Special Marriage Act allowed Muslims to marry under it and thereby retain the protections, generally beneficial to Muslim women, that could not be found in the personal law. Under this act polygamy was illegal, and inheritance and succession would be governed by the Indian Succession Act, rather than the respective Muslim Personal Law. Divorce also would be governed by the secular law, and maintenance of a divorced wife would be along the lines set down in the civil law. Therefore, the Special Marriage Act provided significant protection to religious minorities which could not be found in the Personal Law of their religion such as the Muslim Personal Law.

Significance of Shah Bano case 

The frequent conflict between secular and religious authorities over the issue of uniform civil code eventually decreased, until the 1985 Shah Bano case. Bano was a 73-year-old woman who sought maintenance from her husband, Muhammad Ahmad Khan. He had divorced her after 40 years of marriage by triple Talaaq (saying "I divorce thee" three times) and denied her regular maintenance; this sort of unilateral divorce which discriminates against women is permitted under the Muslim Personal Law. She was initially granted maintenance by the verdict of a local court in 1980. Khan, a lawyer himself, challenged this decision, taking it to the Supreme court, saying that he had fulfilled all his obligations under Islamic law. The Supreme court ruled in favour of Shah Bano in 1985 under the "maintenance of wives, children and parents" provision (Section 125) of the All India Criminal Code, which applied to all citizens irrespective of religion. It further recommended that a uniform civil code be set up. Besides her case, two other Muslim women had previously received maintenance under the Criminal code in 1979 and 1980.

The Shah Bano case soon became nationwide political issue and a widely debated controversy.  While the Liberal and Progressive Indians as well as progressive Muslim women supported the Supreme Court judgement as being supportive of women, The All India Muslim Board defended the application of Muslim Personal Law which was based on Sharia Law and denied divorced Muslim women the right to alimony. The judgement of the Supreme Court, which sought to offer protection to muslim women was argued to be an attack Muslim Personal Law by conservative Muslims.

The orthodox Muslims felt that their communal identity was at stake if their personal laws were governed by the judiciary. Rajiv Gandhi's Congress government, which previously had the support of Muslim minorities, lost the local elections in December 1985 because of its endorsement of the Supreme Court's decision. The members of the Muslim board, including Khan, started a campaign for complete autonomy in their personal laws. It soon reached a national level, by consulting legislators, ministers and journalists. The press played a considerable role in sensationalising this incident.

An independent Muslim parliament member proposed a bill to protect their personal law in the parliament. The Muslim Women (Protection of Rights of Divorce) Bill 1986, sought to make section 125 of Criminal Procedure Code inapplicable to Muslim women, which meant that the reversal of the Supreme Court judgement. Further, it also sough to legislate that alimony be paid by a Muslim man only for a period of 90 days after the divorce was demanded by the muslim husband. Reeling from the electoral defeat, the Indian National Congress under the leadership of Rajiv Gandhi reversed its previous position and supported this bill while the liberal groups such as the Left, Muslim liberals and women's organisations strongly opposed it. The Muslim Women's (Protection of Rights on Divorce) was passed in 1986, which made Section 125 of the Criminal Procedure Code inapplicable to Muslim women. This was a colossal defeat of liberal movements and protection of women in Indian society.

The politicisation led to argument having two major sides: the Congress and Muslim conservatives versus the liberal groups, women's organisations and the Left. In 1987, the Minister of Social Welfare, Rajendra Kumari Bajpai, reported that no women were given maintenance by the Wakf Board in 1986. Women activists highlighted their legal status and according to them, "main problem is that there [are] many laws but women are dominated not by secular laws, not by uniform civil laws, but by religious laws." The legal reversal of introducing the Muslim Women law significantly hampered the nationwide women's movement in the 1980s.

Current status and opinions

Definition of the proposal 
UCC is meant to replace currently applicable various laws applicable to various respective communities which are inconsistent with each other. These laws include the Hindu Marriage Act, Hindu Succession Act, Indian Christian Marriages Act, Indian Divorce Act, Parsi Marriage and Divorce Act. Meanwhile certain ones like Sharia (Islamic laws) are not codified and solely based upon their religious scriptures.

The proposals in UCC include monogamy, equal rights for son and daughter over inheritance of paternal property and gender & religion neutral laws in regards of will charity, divinity, guardianship and sharing of custody. The laws may not result into much difference to the status of Hindu society as they have already been applicable on Hindus through Hindu code bills for decades.

Points of view 
India is a 'secular' nation which means a separation between religion and state matters. Moreover, 'secularism' in India means equality of all religions and practitioners of all religions before the law. Currently, with a mix of different civil codes, different citizens are treated differently based on their religion. The rights of a Hindu woman are far more progressive than those of a Muslim woman who is governed by Muslim Personal Law based on Sharia law. Women's rights groups have said that this issue is only based on their rights and security, irrespective of sensationalism by religious conservatives. The arguments for it are: its mention in Article 44 of the Constitution, need for strengthening the unity and integrity of the country, rejection of different laws for different communities, importance for gender equality and reforming the archaic personal laws of Muslims—which allow unilateral divorce and polygamy. India is, thus, among the nations that legally apply the Sharia law. According to Qutub Kidwai, the Muslim Personal laws are "Anglo-Mohammadan" rather than solely Islamic. The Hindu nationalists view this issue in concept of their law, which they say, is secular and equal to both sexes. In the country, demanding a uniform civil code can be seen negatively by religious authorities and secular sections of society because of identity politics. The Sangh Parivar and the Bharatiya Janata Party (BJP)—one of the two major political parties in India, had taken up this issue to ensure that every citizen of the country is treated equally before the law. The BJP was the first party in the country to promise it if elected into power.

Goa is the only state in India which has a uniform civil code. The Goa Family Law, is the set of civil laws, originally the Portuguese Civil Code, continued to be implemented after its annexation in 1961. Sikhs and Buddhists objected to the wording of Article 25 which terms them as Hindus with personal laws being applied to them. However, the same article also guarantees the right of members of the Sikh faith to bear a Kirpan. Today, Goa is a leading example of different religious groups - catholics, protestants, Hindus and Muslims living in harmony due to its Uniform Civil Code.

In October 2015, Supreme Court of India asserted the need of a uniform civil code and said that, "This cannot be accepted, otherwise every religion will say it has a right to decide various issues as a matter of its personal law. We don’t agree with this at all. It has to be done through a decree of a court". On 30 November 2016, British Indian intellectual Tufail Ahmad unveiled a 12-point document draft of it, citing no effort by the government since 1950. The Law Commission of India stated on August 31, 2018 that a uniform civil code is "neither necessary nor desirable at this stage" in a 185-page consultation paper, adding that secularism cannot contradict plurality prevalent in the country.

Indian society in pre-independence era had many other consideration like socio-coeconomic status, Jati and gotra etc. in case of marriages. While the Hindu code bills wiped out all such practices in Hindu, Jains, Sikh, Buddhist, Parsi, Christian communities, some conservative section of these society had been demanding amendments to their Marriage Acts. Critics of UCC continue to oppose it as a threat to religious freedom. They consider abolition of religious laws to be against secularism and UCC as a means for BJP to target Muslims while look progressive at the same time meanwhile BJP continues to promote UCC as means of achieving religious equality and equal rights for women by fending off religious laws.

Legal status and prospects 
UCC had been included in BJP's manifesto for the 1998 and 2019 elections and was even proposed for introduction in the Parliament for the first time in November 2019 by Narayan Lal Panchariya. Amid protests by opposition MPs, the bill although soon was withdrawn for making certain amendments. The bill was brought for a second time by Kirodi Lal Meena in March 2020 but was not introduced again. As per reports which emerged in 2020, the bill is being contemplated in BJP due to differences with RSS.

A plea was filed in the Delhi High Court which sought establishment of a judicial commission or a high level expert committee to direct central government to prepare a draft of UCC in three months. In April 2021, a request was filed to transfer plea to the Supreme Court so that filing of more such pleas throughout various high courts doesn't bring inconsistency throughout India. The draft would further be published on website for 60 days to facilitate extensive public debate and feedback.

In March 2022, the Uttarakhand government led by Pushkar Singh Dhami decided to work on the implementation of UCC in the state. However, the RSS leaderships have stated that any uniform civil code (UCC) should be “beneficial for all communities”’ and “well thought out, not hurried."

See also 
 All India Muslim Personal Law Board
 Hindu code bills
 Religious law
 Family law
 Secularism in India
 Sharia

References 
Citations

Bibliography

Further reading 
Shourie, Arun (2005). A Secular Agenda: For Saving Our Country, for Welding It. New Delhi, India: Rupa.

External links 
"Muslim women fight instant divorce" from BBC
"So Do We Want A UCC?" article by Dilip D'Souza from Outlook
"Law Commission’s report on uniform civil code not before 2018" article by Jatin Gandhi from Hindustan Times

Civil codes
Women's rights in India
Indian family law
Identity politics in India
Women's rights in religious movements